The Mungindi Bridge is a road bridge that carries the Carnarvon Highway across the Barwon River on the Queensland/New South Wales border at Mungindi, New South Wales, Australia.

Current bridge 
The current Mungindi Bridge is a two-lane concrete bridge with a pedestrian footpath on one side. The bridge is higher to improve flood immunity of the rural highway. Construction of the current bridge and road approaches was jointly funded by New South Wales and Queensland state governments under the Southern Queensland Accelerated Road Rehabilitation Project.

Old bridge
The original Mungindi Bridge was a Dare-type truss road bridge, designed by Harvey Dare. It was one of forty Dare-type truss bridges built in New South Wales. The bridge was built by Lawson and Wladro in 1914.

See also 

 Historic bridges of New South Wales
 List of bridges in Australia

References

Road bridges in Queensland
Road bridges in New South Wales
Bridges completed in 2010
2010 establishments in Australia
Concrete bridges
Borders of New South Wales
Borders of Queensland